Kenneth Tresoor (born November 27, 1966) is a Canadian curler.

Teams

References

External links
 
 Ken Tresoor – Curling Canada Stats Archive

Living people
Canadian male curlers
Curlers from Winnipeg
World curling champions
Brier champions
1966 births
Canada Cup (curling) participants